Results from Norwegian football in 1939.

Norgesserien 1938/39

District I

District II, Group A

District II, Group B

District III

District IV, Group A

District IV, Group B

District V, Group A

District V, Group B

District VI

District VII

District VIII

Championship rounds

First round
1st leg
May 21: Nydalen-Skeid 0-3
Odd-Ørn 0-3

May 26: Stavanger IF-Flekkefjord 1-0

2nd leg
May 25: Skeid-Nydalen 2-2 (Total 5-2)
May 26: Ørn-Odd 1-2 (Total 4-2)
May 29: Flekkefjord-Stavanger IF 2-3 (Total 2-4)

Quarter-finals
1st leg
June 4: Hamar-Fredrikstad 2-1
Skeid-Ørn 5-0
Hardy-Stavanger IF 2-2
Rosenborg-Kristiansund 5-1

2nd leg
June 11: Fredrikstad-Hamar 4-1 (Total 5-3)
Ørn-Skeid 4-3 (Total 5-8)
Stavanger IF-Hardy 3-5 (Total 5-7)
Kristiansund-Rosenborg 2-2 (Total 3-7)

Semi-finals
June 25: Rosenborg-Skeid 0-1
Hardy-Fredrikstad 1-1 (extra time)

First rematch
July 2: Fredrikstad-Hardy 2-2 (extra time)

Second rematch
July 9: Hardy-Fredrikstad 2-3 (extra time)

Championship final
July 16: Fredrikstad-Skeid 2-1

Promotion
Briskebyen, Egersund, Kvik Trondheim, Mandalskameratene, Molde, Pallas, selbak, Solberg, Tønsbergkameratene, Ulefoss, Vikersund

Norwegian Cup

Final

Northern Norwegian Cup

Final

National team

References

 
Seasons in Norwegian football